Partalos, is a Greek dance from Macedonia, Greece. It is a danced exclusively by men and it is very widespread in the area of Pylaia, Thessaloniki. It has six steps that include leaps and squats.

See also
Music of Greece
Greek dances

References

Ελληνικοί παραδοσιακοί χοροί: Παρτάλος
http://www.greeksongs-greekmusic.com/popular-dances-of-macedonia/

Greek dances
Macedonia (Greece)